Ma'anshan, also colloquially written as Maanshan, is a prefecture-level city in the eastern part of Anhui province in Eastern China. An industrial city stretching across the Yangtze River, Ma'anshan borders Hefei to the west, Wuhu to the southwest, and  Nanjing to the east. It is a satellite city of the Nanjing metropolitan area and is also a city in the Yangtze River Delta Economic Zone.

As of the 2020 census, Ma'anshan was home to 2,159,930 inhabitants, of whom 1,253,960 lived in the built-up (or metro) area made of Huashan and Yushan urban districts and Dangtu County, which is largely urbanized.

One can notice that Ma'anshan is now being conurbated with Nanjing making a combined built-up area of 8,419,252 inhabitants.
After the August 2011 administrative re-regionalization of Anhui Province, its population rose to 2.16 million, as two additional counties (He and Hanshan) were placed under its administration.

Administration
The prefecture-level city of Ma'anshan administers 6 county-level divisions, including 3 districts and 3 counties.

Yushan District
Huashan District
Bowang District
Dangtu County
He County
Hanshan County

In September 2012, Jinjiazhuang District was dissolved and merged with Huashan District, while part of Dangtu County was split and established as Bowang District.

Name
The name of the city means "Horse Saddle Mountain". According to legend, the name came to be when the Western Chu hegemon Xiang Yu was fleeing from the Battle of Gaixia. Rather than be captured, the defeated general killed himself at the area now known as Ma'anshan after ensuring that his beloved horse would be ferried across the river to safety. Upon seeing his master die, the grief-stricken horse leapt into the river and was drowned. As a tribute, the boatman buried the horse's saddle on a nearby hill, giving Ma'anshan its name.

City Flower and City Tree 
Osmanthus fragrans is the city flower of Ma'anshan and is widely planted in Ma'anshan. The climate of Ma'anshan is more rainy and mild, suitable for the growth of sweet-scented osmanthus. Generally from mid-September to Chinese National Day, the sweet-scented osmanthus blooms.

Camphor tree is the city tree of Ma'anshan. Camphor trees are very popular among residents of Ma'anshan. Residents of Ma'anshan City often regard camphor trees as landscape trees and feng shui trees. Feng shui in China means warding off evil spirits, longevity and good luck.

History
The coming of a railroad and the opening of the Huai-nan coalfield in the 1930s made it possible for the Japanese to open an iron and steel works in 1938. Although destroyed at the end of the Second World War, the industries were restored to production in 1953, and Ma'anshan grew rapidly under the Communists' first and second Five-Year Plans. Ma'anshan also has sulfur and limestone mines, and chemical and cement factories.
In 1954, Ma'anshan was elevated to town level, and, in Oct. 12, 1956, Ma'anshan City was declared to be founded.

Geography and climate

Surrounded by low hills (the name of the city means "horse saddle mountain"), Ma'anshan is not as polluted as other major Chinese steelmaking cities, thanks to the environmental policies taken by the local government that granted the city the recognition as one of the "Ten Green Cities of China."

Its climate is similar to other cities in the Yangtze River Delta, with lower humidity that makes its summers and winters less extreme. There are frequent showers during July and August.

, a famous ancient battlefield from the Jin–Song Wars lying to the southwest of the city, is regarded as the best of three rocks that project over the Yangtze River. Taibai pavilion is one of four famous pavilions along the Yangtze river. Caishi scenic area is a national tourism spot, with a combination of natural and cultural attractions.

Economy
The main industry is the steel industry (MaGang) which employs much of the workforce of Ma'anshan. 
At present (2005) major expansions of the steel plant are underway to increase production drastically.
With the advanced manufacturing infrastructure and fast transportation link, Ma'anshan has received much investment in many industries.

Ma'anshan city has an annual manufacture investment ranking No.1 in Anhui Province and her GDP ranks No.4 in Anhui Province after Hefei, Anqing and Wuhu. Ma'anshan's population ranks No.16 in the province and has a GDP per capita of US$7,118 which is No.1 in Anhui Province and near the average of Yangtze River Delta.

Maanshan has been identified by the Economist Intelligence Unit in the November 2010 Access China White Paper as a member of the CHAMPS (Chongqing, Hefei, Anshan, Ma'anshan, Pingdingshan and Shenyang), an economic profile of the top 20 emerging cities in China.

Transportation
The deep water river port of Ma'anshan, with custom offices ensures fast and inexpensive transportation to other cities both in the East coast, and the inner cities along the Yangtze River. By road, Ma'anshan is connected with highways to Nanjing, Shanghai, Hangzhou, Ningbo, Hefei and Wuhu.

The city has one Yangtze River crossing—the Ma'anshan Yangtze River Bridge, opened in 2013, enables direct road access to cities in northern Anhui.

, plans are underway to extend Nanjing Metro to Ma'anshan, the future Line S2 (Nanjing Metro) under review will connect Ma'anshan as well as the Dangtu County to the south with the city of Nanjing.

Culture
There is a memorial to the famous Chinese poet, Li Bai (a.k.a. Li Po c.700-762), just west of Ma'anshan. Li Bai is said to have drowned at Ma'anshan after attempting to embrace a reflection of the moon.

China's first poetry festival was held in Ma'anshan from October 25–30, 2005. The theme of the festival, sponsored by the Ministry of Culture, the Chinese Writers Association, and the Anhui provincial government, was "Poetic China, Harmonious China." The Ma'anshan Sports Centre Stadium, a 36,542-capacity venue, is located in the city. The football stadium opened in 2019.

Shopping 
 Dahua International Plaza is located in the northeast corner of Tuanjie Plaza, with a total construction area of 140,000 square meters. It is currently the largest comprehensive shopping mall in Maanshan City.
 Ma'anshan Yaohan is located in Building A, Phase II of Dahua Plaza. It opened on November 28, 2009. It has a business area of 36,000 square meters and 600 underground parking spaces. On November 28, 2010, a single-day sales record of Huadi Group Yaohan was set at 27 million yuan.
 Xintiandi Plaza is located on Jiefang Road Commercial Street.
 Hongtai Xinbai is located in Jiefang Road Commercial Street with a business area of 15,000 square meters.
 Hong Kong City is located at the intersection of Hunan Road and Hudong Road.
 Golden Eagle International is located at the intersection of Hunan Road and Hudong Road. It opened on August 29, 2015.
 Wanda Plaza is a large-scale high-end shopping mall under Wanda Group.
 Impression City is located at the intersection of Yushan Road and Kangle Road.

Cultural places 
 Zhu Ran Family Cemetery
 Li Bai Tomb
 Hexian Yuanren Site
 Lingjiatan Site
 Taibailou
 Caishi Rock
 Taibai Tower (Zanxian Tower, one of the three famous buildings on the Yangtze River)
 Sanyuandong
 Santai Court
 Yushan Lake
 Putang Scenic Area
 Li Bai Cemetery
 Tomb of Zhu Ran
 Overlord Temple
 Baochan Mountain
 Jilongshan National Forest Park

Local products 
Hengwang Mountain Rice Wine: Hengwangshan rice wine has a long history, dating back to the Jin and Tang dynasties. According to historical records, the current Hengwangshan rice wine originated in the Qing period. Hengwang Mountain rice wine, brewed by ancient methods, is exquisite. In 2013, Hengwangshan rice wine brewing skills were announced as the fourth batch of municipal intangible cultural heritage protection list by the Maanshan Municipal Government.
 Bowang Wind fish: When wind fish was founded, the exact age is no longer available. There is a saying that in the late Qing Dynasty, an outsider was involved in the management of fishing in the Shijiu Lake area of Bowang. Since there were a lot of bream fish, and they could not be refrigerated in that era, he created a way to dry the fish for long-term preservation. It was recognized as a national green food in 2008.
 Taihushan antler: Taihu Mountain antler is a special product of Taihu Mountain, Hanshan County, Ma'anshan City, Anhui Province. It is produced in Taihu Mountain Deer Farm. Antler is a precious medicinal material, which has the functions of invigorating arteries, producing essence, and strengthening bones. It is divided into sika antler and red antler. Sika antler, also called yellow antler or flower antler, mostly has 1 to 2 branches; red antler, also known as green antler, is thicker and has more branches. Antler is a precious Chinese medicinal material with sweet, salty, warm nature and non-toxic.

Education
Anhui University of Technology
 Hohai University Wentian College which is a high institute mainly focus in trading and business management, and expanding to offer the international bachelor's degree for several majors bilingually in English and Chinese.

See also
List of twin towns and sister cities in China

References

External links
Government website of Ma'anshan

 
Cities in Anhui
Populated places on the Yangtze River